Natalia Eyennidth Serna Leyva (born 3 January 2000) is a Mexican badminton player. She affiliate with Jalisco team.

Achievements

BWF International Challenge/Series 
Women's doubles

  BWF International Challenge tournament
  BWF International Series tournament
  BWF Future Series tournament

References

External links 
 

2000 births
Living people
Sportspeople from Jalisco
Mexican female badminton players
21st-century Mexican women